Heyggjurin Mikli is marginally the second highest point of Skuvoy in the central Faroe Islands. At a height of 391 metres the area is hilly. Knukur the highest mountain on the isle is only 1 m higher at its highest point of 392 metres.

Mountains of the Faroe Islands